Lord Grade  may refer to:

 Lew Grade, Baron Grade (1906–1998), Russian-born English impresario and media mogul.
 Michael Grade, Baron Grade of Yarmouth (born 1943), British broadcast executive and businessman, nephew of the above.